6/10 may refer to:
June 10 (month-day date notation)
October 6 (day-month date notation)
The fraction 6/10
"6/10", a 2017 song by Dodie Clark

See also
3/5 (disambiguation)